Count Augustin Ehrensvärd (28 June 1887 – 10 May 1968) was a Swedish nobleman and civil servant.

Career
Ehrensvärd was born in Karlskrona, Sweden, the son of admiral, count Carl August Ehrensvärd (1858–1944) and his wife baroness Lovisa Ulrika "Ulla" (née Thott). He was the brother of general Carl August Ehrensvärd (1892–1974) and vice admiral Gösta Ehrensvärd (1885–1973). Augustin Ehrensvärd, was, according to his brother the general, in fact the most talented of the three brothers.  His great-grandfather was the fortress builder Augustin Ehrensvärd, his uncle was Albert Ehrensvärd and his cousin was Archibald Douglas.

He passed mogenhetsexamen in 1904 and received a theology candidate degree in 1912 before graduated with an administrative degree (kansliexamen) in Uppsala in 1914. Ehrensvärd was assistant in the Ministry of Ecclesiastical Affairs in 1914 and in the Universitetskanslersexpeditionen from 1916 to 1917. He was secretary, expert and komm:r as well as official in the Committee of the Riksdag from 1917 to 1918. He was second administrative officer (kanslisekreterare) in 1920 and first administrative officer in 1921. He was a member of the Executive Committee of the National League of Sweden from 1927 to 1931 and he was acting deputy director (kansliråd) in 1929 and deputy director in the Royal Majesty's Chancery (Kunglig Majestäts kansli) in 1936. He was deputy director from 1939 to 1952.

He was also secretary and administrative director of the Finland Committee (Finlandskommittén) from 1939 to 1940 and was a member of the Working Committee of the Finland Committee from 1941 to 1945.

Personal life
On 21 May 1929 in Turku, he married countess Margaretha Lavinia Magdalena Armfeldt (30 May 1899 – 13 December 1981), the daughter of the Finnish managing director, count August Magnus C:son Armfeldt and his wife Aina Constance Favorin. Ehrensvärd lived his last years in Glemmingebro in the south of Sweden. Ehrensvärd died on 10 May 1968 and was buried 15 May 1968 at Tosterup Cemetery in Tosterup.

Awards and decorations
Commander of the Order of the Polar Star
Knight of the Order of Vasa
Commander of the Order of the Dannebrog
Commander of the Order of the White Rose of Finland
Second Class of the Order of the Cross of Liberty with Swords

References

1887 births
1968 deaths
Swedish counts
Swedish civil servants
People from Karlskrona
Commanders of the Order of the Polar Star
Knights of the Order of Vasa